is a Japanese science fiction drama film directed by Takeshi Furusawa, starring Taishi Nakagawa and based on the manga series of the same name by Yayoiso. It was released in Japan by Shochiku on 15 April 2017. The theme song for the film is "Sakura" by Sonoko Inoue, the cover of Ketsumeishi's 2005 single.

Synopsis
Arata Kaizaki (Taishi Nakagawa) is 27-years-old and unemployed. He quit his prior job after working for the company for 3 months. Arata decides to take part in a research program. He takes medication that makes him look younger and he is to attend high school for a year. There, he falls in love with female high school student Chizuru Hishiro (Yūna Taira)

Cast
Taishi Nakagawa as Arata Kaizaki
Yūna Taira as Chizuru Hishiro
Mahiro Takasugi as Kazuomi Ōga
Elaiza Ikeda as Rena Kariu
 as An Onoya
Yudai Chiba as Ryō Yoake
Kenshō Ono (cameo)

References

External links
 

2010s Japanese films
Shochiku films
Live-action films based on manga
Films directed by Takeshi Furusawa
Films based on webcomics